France–Senegal relations are foreign relations between France and Senegal. Both countries are full members of the Organisation internationale de la Francophonie, and the United Nations.

History

French colonization

Relations between France and Senegal stretch back as early as the 14th century, when French merchants travelled to and traded among the present-day Senegalese coast. France exported cloth, iron and muskets to Senegal and imported textiles, ivory, spices and slaves. In 1659, France established a trading post in present-day Saint-Louis operated by the French West India Company (later known as the Compagnie du Sénégal). As a result of the Seven Years' War (1754-1763) between France and the Kingdom of Great Britain, France lost its possession of Saint-Louis. Saint-Louis was returned to France in 1783 as a result of the French victory during the American Revolutionary War.

During the Napoleonic Wars, Great Britain captured French possessions in Senegal and in 1807 Britain proclaimed the abolition of the slave trade known as the "Slave Trade Act 1807". In 1816, Britain returned to France its possessions in Senegal. During the "Scramble for Africa" France began to insert control of the Senegal river and hinterland of the country. By 1895, Senegal became part of the French West Africa colony with the capital in Saint-Louis before being relocated to Dakar in 1902.

During World War I and World War II, Senegalese soldiers known as Senegalese Tirailleurs fought in both wars for France and they fought during the Battle of France and in the Italian Campaign under the Free France government in exile led by General Charles de Gaulle. After the Liberation of Paris and the end of World War II, Senegal became part of the French Union in 1946.

Independence and present times
In April 1959, Senegal and Mali merged into the Mali Federation and declared independence from France in June 1960. Senegal became an independent nation in April 1960.

Post Independence
France and Senegal established diplomatic relations in August 1960. Both France and Senegal work closely together in West African regional affairs, and maintain a close cultural and political relationship. In 2010, France closed its military base in Senegal, however, France maintains an air force base within the Léopold Sédar Senghor International Airport in Dakar.

Trade
In 2016, trade between France and Senegal totaled €834 million Euros. Senegal is France's 57th largest trading partner globally and third largest from Africa. France is the largest foreign investor in Senegal with over €1.7 billion Euros worth of investments within the country. Several French multinational companies such as BNP Paribas, Eramet, Orange S.A., Necotrans and Société Générale operate in Senegal.

Resident diplomatic missions 
 France has an embassy in Dakar.
 Senegal has an embassy in Paris and consulates-general in Bordeaux, Lyon and in Marseille and a consular agency in Le Havre.

See also
 Louis Faidherbe
 Senegalese people in France
 Liberation of Paris
 Presidential Council for Africa   
 Léopold Sédar Senghor
 Mali–Senegal border
 French people in Senegal
 Mohamed Mbougar Sarr
 Land of the Dogons
 Lycée Français Jacques Prévert

References

 
Senegal
France
Relations of colonizer and former colony